Pull&Bear is a Spanish-French clothing and accessories retailer based in Narón, A Coruña, Galicia founded in 1991. It is part of Inditex, owner of Zara and Bershka brands.

History 
The chain was established in 1991 due to the diversification of Inditex's commercial objective, which at that time only had Zara stores. It started out as a brand only for the male public, but after a few years of its creation it introduced a collection for girls in 1998 that has equaled the male line in sales.

In 2010, the brand introduced a new logo and rebranded its European stores.

In February 2019, Pull&Bear partnered with the sports brand Umbro to jointly launch a line of sportswear products.

In March of 2022, Pull&Bear ceased operations in Russia in support of Ukraine.

Description
Pull&Bear specializes in manufacturing and selling urban style clothing and accessories. The brand uses the US popular culture in its product design.

New product lines introduced in stores have diversified the range of products available in Pull&Bear outlets.  These new lines include; music, technology, video games and video images mixed in with the clothing. Pull&Bear introduced the "XDYE" line in 1998, a more sporty and hi-tech line of clothes linked to the icons of 21st-century youth culture.

Stores 

The number of Pull&Bear stores in each country :

References

External links
 

Companies based in Galicia (Spain)
Clothing companies established in 1991
Retail companies established in 1991
Spanish companies established in 1991
Inditex brands
Clothing brands of Spain
Clothing retailers of Spain